Hem till Norden is a 1996 studio album from Kikki Danielsson & Roosarna.

Track listing

References 

1996 albums
Roosarna albums